Havre de Grace Historic District is a national historic district at Havre de Grace, Harford County, Maryland, United States. It is an urban district of approximately a thousand buildings and includes the central business district and most of the residential neighborhoods radiating out of it. The buildings date primarily from the 19th and early 20th centuries.

It was added to the National Register of Historic Places in 1987.

References

External links
, including photo dated 2000, at Maryland Historical Trust
Boundary Map of the Havre de Grace Historic District, Harford County, at Maryland Historical Trust

Havre de Grace, Maryland
Historic districts in Harford County, Maryland
Historic districts on the National Register of Historic Places in Maryland
National Register of Historic Places in Harford County, Maryland